Lacroix or La Croix is a French topographic surname meaning "the cross". It often referred to a person living near a market or roadside cross, or carrying a cross in a religious pageant. Related names include Cross, LaCrosse, and Delacroix.

Notable people and fictional characters with the name include:

People 
 Alphonse Lacroix, (ice hockey) silver medalist, 1924 Olympics
 André Lacroix (businessman) (born 1960)
 André Lacroix (ice hockey) (born 1945)
 André Lacroix (tennis) (1908–1992)
 Antoine Lacroix (1863–1948), mineralogist and geologist
 Caroline Lacroix (1883–1948), royal mistress
 Charles de la Croix (1792–1869), missionary
 Christian Lacroix (born 1951), fashion 
 Gérald Lacroix (born 1957), cardinal and archbishop of Quebec
 Joe Betts-LaCroix (born 1962), computer industry
 Léo Lacroix (footballer) (born 1992)
 Lisa LaCroix, actress
 Luc M. Lacroix
 Marc Lacroix (disambiguation), multiple people
 Maxence Lacroix, French association football player
 Pat LaCroix (born 1938), musician and photographer
 Paul Lacroix (1806–1884), author and journalist
 Pierre Lacroix (disambiguation), multiple people
 Remy LaCroix (born 1988), pornographic actress
 Robert Lacroix (born 1940), professor of economics
 Sébastien Lacroix (born 1983), Nordic Olympian skier 
 Sylvestre François Lacroix (1765–1843), French mathematician
 Thibault Lacroix (born 1985), rugby union player
 Thierry Lacroix (born 1967), rugby union player
 Vincent Lacroix, former Quebec businessman, head of the Norbourg scandal

Fictional characters
 Lucien LaCroix, character on Forever Knight
 Sebastian LaCroix, from Vampire: The Masquerade – Bloodlines
 Sebastian ‘Bash’ Lacroix, from Anne with an E
 Eno LaCroix, a character from the webcomic Monsterkind 
Amelie Lacroix, a French sniper in the organization Talon from the Blizzard game Overwatch.

References

French-language surnames